The airplane game, also known as the Plane Game, was a style of pyramid scheme in the 1980s first active in North America and then in Western Europe.

The common version of the system involved joining an "airplane" by paying a "pilot" to become one of eight "passengers".  Passengers who started at the fourth step paid to join.  Already on the airplane were four "flight attendants" who were a step ahead, and two "co-pilots" next in line behind the pilot.  Once a pilot collected $12,000 from passengers to retire, the group split into two "airplanes", with each co-pilot becoming the pilot of the new airplane, taking half the participants and promoting everyone a level.  Bringing in new passengers sped up everyone's progression towards retiring as a pilot.  However, the structure of the scheme results in a participant losing the entire payment unless 14 new participants join.

The scheme had spread from New York to Texas to California then South Florida by early 1987, with police raiding meetings in all four states, and reports of more airplane schemes operating in Dallas.  In Miami-Dade County, Florida, at least one recruiting session was reported with 1,000 attendees.  Though common versions at the time required passengers to pay $1,500 to receive $12,000 as a pilot, some airplanes were being run with $5,000 passengers and a $40,000 pilot payout.

The scheme has also gone by the names Concorde and Golden Galaxy with similar names for the steps.  Cash Club, Victoria operated in the same way but with different amounts and the steps renamed to "club member", "committee member", "vice-president", and "president".  "Krona Klub" was a similar scheme with more complex payout rules, as was a so-called game variously called "Cosmic Adventure", "Flying Saucer", or "Flying Starship".

The scheme resurfaced in 2020, conducted over Instagram and other social media platforms, going by a variety of names including Blessing Loom, Loom Game Wheel, Gift of Legacy, and The Prosperity Grid in South Africa.

On the 14th of June 2022, after receiving several complaints from the public, South Africa's Financial Sector Conduct Authority released an official warning to the public regarding The Prosperity Grid. Because pyramid schemes fall outside of the jurisdiction of the FSCA, the matter has been referred to other relevant regulators and authorities.

References

External links
   Originally written in Spring 1993.

1980s fads and trends
Pyramid and Ponzi schemes
2020s fads and trends